Come Somewhere is the debut solo album by King's X drummer Jerry Gaskill. Gaskill wrote all of the material himself, with the exception of "Johnny's Song", which was co-written with Herb Gaskill. Jerry performed all of the vocals, most of the acoustic guitars, and some electric guitar. King's X bandmate Ty Tabor, who produced the album, contributed some guitar and keyboards.

Track listing

Personnel
 Jerry Gaskill - vocals, drums, acoustic guitar, electric guitar
 Ty Tabor - electric guitar, bass, keyboard

References

2004 debut albums
Inside Out Music albums